Bernadette O'Neill is a Northern Irish international lawn bowler.

Bowls career

International
O'Neill won the bronze medal in the fours and pairs at the 2008 World Outdoor Bowls Championship in Christchurch. In addition she won a gold medal at the World Champion of Champions in the triples.

In 2009, she won the fours and pairs bronze medals at the Atlantic Bowls Championships and in 2015 she won the triples gold medal at the Atlantic Bowls Championships.

National
O'Neill won three singles titles at the Irish National Bowls Championships bowling for the Portstewart Bowls Club, in 1999, 2014 and 2016. She also won the pairs in 2004.

References

Female lawn bowls players from Northern Ireland
Living people
Year of birth missing (living people)